Michael Glowatzky (born 1 July 1960) is a German former footballer.

Glowatzky played 158 matches in the East German top flight where he scored 37 goals. The forward made in the mid-1980s into the squad of the East Germany national team where he scored one goal in nine appearances.

References

External links
 
 
 
 Michael Glowatzky at dfb.de 

1960 births
Living people
German footballers
East German footballers
East Germany international footballers
Association football forwards
FSV Zwickau players
Chemnitzer FC players
SpVgg Bayreuth players
1. FC Schweinfurt 05 players
2. Bundesliga players